Esperantisto (meaning the Esperantist) may refer to a number of Esperanto publications including:

La Esperantisto
La Brita Esperantisto
Amerika Esperantisto
Irana Esperantisto
Usona Esperantisto

See also
American Esperantist (disambiguation)
Der Esperantist
The British Esperantist